Yorobodi is a town in eastern Ivory Coast. It is a sub-prefecture of Sandégué Department in Gontougo Region, Zanzan District.

Yorobodi was a commune until March 2012, when it became one of 1126 communes nationwide that were abolished.

In 2014, the population of the sub-prefecture of Yorobodi was 16,708.

Villages
The ten villages of the sub-prefecture of Yorobodi and their population in 2014 are:

Notes

Sub-prefectures of Gontougo
Former communes of Ivory Coast